Zaleptulus is a genus of harvestmen in the family Sclerosomatidae.

Species
 Zaleptulus banksi Roewer, 1955
 Zaleptulus lineatus Roewer, 1955
 Zaleptulus unicolor Roewer, 1955

References

Harvestmen
Harvestman genera